The Independent State of Croatia was established by Germany and Italy 10 April 1941 after Yugoslavia had fallen to Axis forces. The Croatian State survived until January 1945, then the Soviet offense pushed Axis-supporting Croatians back into Austria. The list below covers military equipment of Croatian Axis supporters (Croatian Home Guard, Ustaše militia and Croatian Armed Forces) in the years 1941–1945. It does not include the equipment of the pro-Allies partisans. Also, the equipment of German-controlled units comprising a large fraction of ethic Croatians (373rd, 392nd and 369th infantry divisions) is excluded from this list.

Knives and bayonets
Kampfmesser 42
Seitengewehr 98

Small arms

Pistols (manual and semi-automatic)
FN Model 1922
FN Model 1900
Luger P08
Walther P38
Mauser C96
Tokarev TT-33
Ruby M1915
Nagant M1895
Gasser M1874
Chamelot-Delvigne MAS 1874

Automatic pistols and submachine guns
Thompson submachine gun
STEN
Erma EMP
Beretta Model 38
MP 34
MP 38
MP 40
MP 41
Suomi KP/-31
PPSh-41

Rifles
Karabiner 98k - main rifle
Mauser Gewehr 98
Mauser M1895
Kbk wz. 1929
vz. 24
Berthier M1915
Steyr-Mannlicher M1895
Caracano M1891/41
FN Model 24
Mosin-Nagant M1891/30
Lebel Model 1886
Sturmgewehr 44 and mkb42 (H)

Grenades and grenade launchers
Model 24 grenade
Model 24 smoke grenade

Recoilless rifles

Flamethrowers

Machine guns

Infantry and dual-purpose machine guns
Fiat-Revelli Modello 1914
ZB vz. 26
ZB vz. 30
Schwarlose M07/24
Maschinengewehr 34
Maschinengewehr 42
Chauchat FM 1915
Lewis
PM 1910
Maxim M1909
DWM MG 08
Madsen
Hotchkiss M1914
DShK 1938
Darne M1918

Vehicle and aircraft machine guns

Artillery

Infantry mortars
Stokes mortar (60 mm)
Brandt Mle 27/31 (81 mm)
8 cm Granatwerfer 34
Granatwerfer 42

Heavy mortars and rocket launchers

Field artillery

7.5cm horsky kanon vz. 15
Skoda houfnice vz 14
Canon de 105 mle 1913 Schneider (105mm M.13)
10.4 cm Feldkanone M. 15 (M.15/25)
10.5 cm Feldhaubitze 98/09 (105mm M.98/9)
Canon Court de 105 M(montagne) modèle 1919 Schneider
10.5 cm leFH 16 (105mm M.16)
10.5 cm hruby kanon vz. 35 (local designation 105 mm M.36)
Schneider-Canet 120mm M.15

Fortress and siege guns
12-cm Kanone M 80 (local designation 120 mm M.80 )
Skoda Model 1928 Gun (local designation 150mm M.28)
De Bange 155 mm cannon (local designation 155 mm M.77)

Anti-tank guns
PaK 36 (37mm)
3.7 cm kanon PÚV vz. 34
47 mm kanon P.U.V. vz. 36

Anti-tank weapons (besides anti-tank guns)
Panzerfaust
Panzerschreck

Anti-aircraft weapons

Light anti-aircraft guns
2 cm Flak 30/38/Flakvierling

Heavy anti-aircraft guns
8.35 cm PL kanon vz. 22
9 cm kanon PL vz. 12/20

Vehicles

Tankettes
TKS - 18 received 10 October 1941
L3/33 - 10 received from Hungary in autumn 1942. 30 received from Germany after being captured from Italians in the aftermath of the Armistice of Cassibile 8 September 1943
L3/35 - imported from Italy

Tanks
Renault FT or Renault R35- 16 ex-Yugoslavian vehicles not used in combat, but either scrapped or integrated in armored train
Hotchkiss H39 - received from Germany in spring 1944
L6/40 - 24 received from Germany after being captured from Italians in the aftermath of the Armistice of Cassibile 8 September 1943
M14/41 - 15 received from Germany after being captured from Italians in the aftermath of the Armistice of Cassibile 8 September 1943
Panzer I - 21 received in the first half of July 1942
Panzer III N - 20 to 25 vehicles received in late 1944
Panzer IV, models F, G and H - 15 received in late 1944

Self-propelled guns

Tank-based
Semovente da 47/32 - 10 received from Germany in May 1944
StuG III Ausf. G - 8 received from Germany in August 1944

Other
improvised armored Train, using turrets of either Renault FT or Hotchkiss H39

Armored cars
Autoblindo 41 - 10 received from Germany after being captured from Italians in the aftermath of the Armistice of Cassibile 8 September 1943
Sd. Kfz. 221 - 12 received from Germany

Armored carriers
Sd.Kfz. 251 - 12 to 15 vehicles received in middle 1944

Engineering and command

Trucks
Opel Blitz A

Passenger cars
Volkswagen Kübelwagen
Volkswagen Schwimmwagen

Motorcycles
BMW R75

Tractors and prime movers
C2P artillery tractor (unarmoured design based on TKS)

Miscellaneous vehicles

Navy ships and war vessels
Croatian Navy was restricted until September, 1943 to do not have any vessel over 50 tons displacement. Therefore, the Navy was limited to coastal patrol crafts.

Aircraft

Initial batch (1941)
Ikarus IK-2 - 4
Hawker Hurricane - 6
Dornier Do 17K - 6 until May, 1941 
Bristol Blenheim I - 8
Potez 25 - 45
Breguet 19 - 50
Fizir F1V - 5
Zmaj Fizir FP-2
Fokker F.IX model F.39 - 1
Savoia-Marchetti SM.79 -1
Avia BH-33 E - 7
Hawker Fury II - 1

Reinforcements (1942)
Caproni Ca.311 M - 10
AVIA FL.3 - 20
Fiat G.50bis Freccia - 9
Fiat G.50B (trainer) - 1
Dornier Do 17K - 11 + (9 on Russian front)
Bristol Blenheim I - 3
Caproni Ca.310 - 1
Rogožarski PVT - 15
Rogožarski R-100 (ground attack version) - 11
Potez 25 ~ 4
Breguet 19 ~ 4
Zmaj Fizir FN ~ 4 or 23
Zmaj Fizir FP-2 ~ 4
Fokker F.7 - 7
Fokker F.9 - 1
Fokker F.XVIII - 1

Frontline reinforcements (1943)
Dornier Do 17E - 30
Bücker Bü 131 - 34
Saiman 200 - 25
Morane-Saulnier M.S.406 - 48
Beneš-Mráz Beta-Minor - 25
Fiat CR.42 - 6 (captured from Italy)
CANT Z.1007 ~ 4 (captured from Italy)
Fiat BR.20 Cicogna ~ 4 (captured from Italy)
Fiat G.50 Freccia ~ 43 (captured from Italy)

Last reinforcements (1944-1945)
Macchi C.202 - 18
Macchi C.200 ~ 4
Macchi C.205 - 4
Messerschmitt 109G - 46
Bücker Bü 181 - 22
Ju 87D - 15
Ju 87R-2 - 6
Fieseler Fi 167 ~ 11
Dornier Do 17E - 12
Messerschmitt 110G - 2

Secret weapons

Radars

Missiles and bombs

Cartridges and shells

Panzergranate 39 (Pzgr. 39)
sprenggranate (Sprgr.)
9×19 mm Parabellum
7.92×33mm Kurz
7.92×57mm Mauser

References

Croatia Army World War II
Croatia in World War II